Tomáš Březina (born 21 February 1957 in Prague) is a Czech politician and businessman.

Personal life
Březina was born in Prague and raised in Husinec and Nalžovské Hory. He has three children.

Career
Březina is founder and former director of BEST, one of the leading domestic manufacturers of concrete building elements. He is nicknamed the "concrete king" or "concrete Bata". In the years 1996–1998, he was a member of the Chamber of Deputies of the Czech Republic for the Civic Democratic Party, later for the Freedom Union. He founded and leads the Czech Union of Concrete Workers, before that he led the Association of Garden Architecture Manufacturers. Březina was a candidate in 2023 Czech presidential election, but due to failure to meet the legal conditions for candidacy, he was disqualified from the election.

References 

Czech businesspeople
Living people
1957 births
Civic Democratic Party (Czech Republic) MPs
Freedom Union MPs
Candidates in the 2023 Czech presidential election
Members of the Chamber of Deputies of the Czech Republic (1996–1998)